Turowo may refer to the following places:
Turowo, Kuyavian-Pomeranian Voivodeship (north-central Poland)
Turowo, Mława County in Masovian Voivodeship (east-central Poland)
Turowo, Przasnysz County in Masovian Voivodeship (east-central Poland)
Turowo, Greater Poland Voivodeship (west-central Poland)
Turowo, Pomeranian Voivodeship (north Poland)
Turowo, Ełk County in Warmian-Masurian Voivodeship (north Poland)
Turowo, Nidzica County in Warmian-Masurian Voivodeship (north Poland)
Turowo, Pisz County in Warmian-Masurian Voivodeship (north Poland)
Turowo, West Pomeranian Voivodeship (north-west Poland)